Emma White (born August 23, 1997) is an American former professional racing cyclist, who last rode for UCI Women's Continental Team .

Biography
The sister of fellow racing cyclist Curtis White, Emma started cycle racing at the age of nine, initially in cyclo-cross. She had already taken up horse riding early in her childhood, and continued to pursue this alongside cycling until the age of 16. She won three consecutive national junior cyclo-cross championships in the 13-14 and 15-16 age groups between 2011 and 2013 before winning the 17-18 junior title in 2015. She also enjoyed a successful junior career on the road, winning consecutive national junior time trial championships in different age groups in 2013 and 2014 and the national junior criterium championship in 2015, as well as taking two silver medals at the 2015 UCI Road World Championships.

White also won a bronze medal in the 2015 U23 national cyclo-cross championships. She was subsequently crowned national U23 cyclo-cross champion in 2018, also placing seventh in the U23 race at the 2018 UCI Cyclo-cross World Championships. Shortly after the cyclo-cross worlds, she attended a track talent ID camp at the behest of her coach, Kristin Armstrong, and was invited by Gary Sutton, the coach of the US team pursuit squad, to join the team, to which she agreed, beginning training with the squad in the summer of 2018.

The following year White became national senior criterium champion in Knoxville: at the age of 21 she became the youngest rider to win that title, additionally securing the U23 championship. She dedicated her victory to her former team-mate Kelly Catlin, who had committed suicide earlier in 2019. A couple of days later, she went on to finish third in the senior United States National Road Race Championships and win the U23 road title. That year she also graduated from Union College, having pursued an interdepartmental major in computer science and science, medicine and technology.

White was selected to compete in the team pursuit at the 2020 Track Cycling World Championships alongside Lily Williams, Chloé Dygert and Jennifer Valente: the quartet set the fastest time in qualifying and beat Great Britain in the final to win the rainbow jersey. She also competed in the same event at the delayed 2020 Olympics in Tokyo the following year: although Team USA were defeated by Team GB in the semi-finals, they took bronze in the third place ride-off against Canada. White announced her retirement from competition in October 2021 at the age of 24, shortly after taking a final win in the criterium at the Sea Otter Classic where she led a clean sweep for Rally Cycling ahead of team-mates Heidi Franz and Kristabel Doebel-Hickok.

Major results
Source:
2014
 National Junior Road Championships
1st  Time trial
2nd Road race
 5th Time trial, UCI Junior Road World Championships
2015
 National Junior Road Championships
1st  Criterium
 2nd Time trial
 UCI Junior Road World Championships
2nd Road race 
2nd Time trial
 3rd National U23 Cyclo-cross Championships
2017
 1st Stage 4 (ITT) Tour of the Gila
2018
 National Road Championships
1st  Under-23 road race 
1st  Under-23 time trial
1st  Under-23 criterium
3rd Road race
3rd Time trial
 1st  National U23 Cyclo-cross Championships
 1st  Sprints classification Tour of California
 8th Overall Tour of the Gila
1st  Points classification
1st Stage 4 
 7th UCI U23 Cyclo-cross World Championships
2019
 National Criterium Championships
 1st  Senior
 1st  U23
 10th Overall Women's Tour of Scotland
2020
1st  Team pursuit, UCI Track World Championships
2021
1st Sea Otter Classic, criterium
3rd  Team pursuit, Olympic Games

See also
 List of 2016 UCI Women's Teams and riders

References

External links
 

1997 births
Living people
American female cyclists
American track cyclists
Cyclists from New York (state)
People from Duanesburg, New York
UCI Track Cycling World Champions (women)
Olympic cyclists of the United States
Cyclists at the 2020 Summer Olympics
Medalists at the 2020 Summer Olympics
Olympic bronze medalists for the United States in cycling
21st-century American women